The 2015 UCI Track Cycling World Championships were the World Championships for track cycling in 2015. They took place in Saint-Quentin-en-Yvelines (part of the Paris Metropolitan Area) at the Vélodrome de Saint-Quentin-en-Yvelines from 18–22 February 2015.

Schedule
This was the schedule of events:

Participating nations

385 cyclists from 38 countries were registered for the championships. The number of cyclists per nation is shown in parentheses.

Medal summary

Medal table

Medalists

Shaded events are non-Olympic

Broadcasting
36 TV stations broadcast the event.

See also

Cycling at the 2015 Pan American Games

References

External links

Official results
UCI Championships' page

 
UCI Track Cycling World Championships
2015
2015 UCI Track Cycling World Championships
2015 UCI Track Cycling World Championships
UCI Track Cycling World Championships
UCI Track